The Women Men Marry is a 1937 American film directed by Errol Taggart and starring George Murphy, Josephine Hutchinson, Claire Dodd and Toby Wing. The film's script is credited to Donald Henderson Clarke.

Cast
 George Murphy - Bill Raeburn
 Josephine Hutchinson - Jane Carson
 Claire Dodd - Claire Raeburn
 Sidney Blackmer - Walter Wiley
 Cliff Edwards - Jerry Little
 John Wray - Brother Nameless
 Peggy Ryan - Mary Jane 
 Helen Jerome Eddy - Sister Martin
 Rollo Lloyd - Peter Martin
 Edward McWade - Brother Lamb
 Toby Wing - Sugar
 Leonard Penn - Quinn
 Walter Walker - "Pop"
 Donald Douglas - Auctioneer McVey
 Winifred Harris - Dowager
 Charles Dunbar - Taxi driver
 Margaret Bert - Wiley's Secretary
 James Blaine - Timothy
 Edwin Stanley - Charley
 Hooper Atchley - Arnold, Wiley's

References

External links
 
 

1937 films
Metro-Goldwyn-Mayer films
1937 drama films
American drama films
Films directed by Errol Taggart
American black-and-white films
Films scored by Edward Ward (composer)
1930s English-language films
1930s American films